Gianmarco Piccioni (born 18 July 1991) is an Italian professional footballer who plays as a forward for Acireale.

Club career

Sambenedettese
Born in San Benedetto del Tronto, Marche, Piccioni started his career at hometown club Sambenedettese. Since 2007–08 season he played for its under-20 team. In 2008–09 Lega Pro Prima Divisione he also played 4 games for the first team.

Vicenza
In January 2009 he was sold to Serie B team Vicenza for €100,000 along with Mattia Evangelisti (€100,000), Filippo Forò (€150,000) and German Pomiro (€100,000). Sambenedettese also signed Stefano Pietribiasi (€150,000) and Marco Zentil (€150,000) in exchange. The two clubs also retained 50% registration rights of the 6 players. Piccioni signed a -year contract. In June 2009 the co-ownership deal was renewed except Evangelisti (to Vicenza) and Zentil (to Sambenedettese). However Sambenedettese soon bankrupted. Piccioni played 18 games in under-20 league in 2009–10 season.

L'Aquila
In August 2010 he was sold to L'Aquila of Lega Pro Seconda Divisione (Italian fourth division). Piccioni only played a handful game for the first team but was selected by Lega Pro under-20 representative team once, for a training camp. In January 2011 he was selected by Seconda Divisione Group C U-21 representative team for 2011 Lega Pro Quadrangular Tournament, eventually Group C was the winner.

On 31 August 2011 Piccioni returned to LP Prima Divisione (Italian third division) for Lanciano. On the same day L'Aquila signed Roberto Colussi in exchange.

Rimini
On 8 January 2019, he signed with Rimini.

Arzignano
On 7 September 2019, he joined Arzignano.

References

External links
 Lanciano Profile  
 Football.it Profile 

1991 births
Living people
People from San Benedetto del Tronto
Sportspeople from the Province of Ascoli Piceno
Footballers from Marche
Italian footballers
Association football forwards
Serie C players
Lega Pro Seconda Divisione players
Serie D players
A.S. Sambenedettese players
L.R. Vicenza players
L'Aquila Calcio 1927 players
S.S. Virtus Lanciano 1924 players
Santarcangelo Calcio players
S.S. Teramo Calcio players
Rimini F.C. 1912 players
F.C. Arzignano Valchiampo players
U.S.D. Recanatese 1923 players
S.S.D. F.C. Messina players
S.S.D. Acireale Calcio 1946 players
Maltese Premier League players
Mosta F.C. players
Balzan F.C. players
Liga I players
FC Politehnica Iași (2010) players
Liga II players
FC UTA Arad players
Italian expatriate footballers
Expatriate footballers in Bulgaria
Italian expatriate sportspeople in Bulgaria
Expatriate footballers in Malta
Italian expatriate sportspeople in Malta
Expatriate footballers in Romania
Italian expatriate sportspeople in Romania